Robert Glenn Baumhower (born August 4, 1955) is an American former professional football player who was a defensive tackle for the Miami Dolphins in the National Football League (NFL). He played college football for the University of Alabama under Coach Paul "Bear" Bryant from 1973 to 1976 and professional football for the Miami under coach Don Shula. He later became a restauranteur.

Early life and college
Baumhower attended North Palm Beach Gardens High School in Florida for two seasons before playing at Tuscaloosa High School his senior year.

Playing as a defensive tackle in college at the University of Alabama under coach Bear Bryant, Baumhower helped lead the Crimson Tide to two 11–1 records as well as a 31–4 overall record. He was part of the 1974 team which lost to Notre Dame in the Orange Bowl, the 1975 team which defeated Penn State in the Sugar Bowl, and the 1976 team which won the Liberty Bowl over UCLA. Baumhower was a first-team All-Southeastern Conference selection in both 1975 and 1976. After the 1976 season, he was invited to play in the Senior Bowl college all-star game.

Professional career
Baumhower was drafted by the Dolphins with the 40th overall pick (second round) in the 1977 NFL draft, behind the first round pick, another defensive lineman from the Southeastern Conference, A. J. Duhe of LSU; earning a spot on the 1977 All-Rookie team. Baumhower and Duhe would share the 1977 Defensive Rookie of the Year honors. He was selected five times to the Pro Bowl in the NFL.

Baumhower and Duhe, who eventually was moved to inside linebacker, formed the heart of the Dolphins' "Killer B's" defense of the late 1970s through mid-1980s, coached by defensive coordinator Bill Arnsparger. Baumhower was flanked on the line by ends Doug Betters and Kim Bokamper, while other stars of the unit included outside linebacker Bob Brudzinski and defensive backs Lyle Blackwood and Glenn Blackwood. The unit was ranked first in the NFL in total defense in 1982, when Miami reached Super Bowl XVII.

The 1983 season may have been Baumhower's best as he was named NFL Defensive Player of the Year (Pro Football Weekly), first-team All-Pro (Associated Press),  first-team All-AFC (United Press International) and a starter in the Pro Bowl game. He was a first-team All-NFL selection in 1981 and 1983 and first-team All-AFC in 1979, 1981 and 1983.

Baumhower would retire after the 1986 season. He was inducted into the Alabama Sports Hall of Fame in 1995.

On December 14, 2008, Baumhower was inducted into The Miami Dolphin Honor Roll during a ceremony at Dolphin Stadium (now Hard Rock Stadium).

Restaurants
Baumhower is also the owner and CEO of Aloha Hospitality, which owns and operates restaurants throughout Alabama including the fine dining establishment Dauphin's in Mobile as well as his namesake Baumhower's Victory Grille.

Notes

References

External links

1955 births
Living people
Alabama Crimson Tide football players
American football defensive linemen
Miami Dolphins players
American Conference Pro Bowl players
American restaurateurs
Players of American football from Virginia